Matthew is the fifth studio album by American rapper and producer Kool Keith. It was released on July 25, 2000, via Funky Ass Records. The entire record was produced by Kool Keith himself, except for track 16, produced by KutMasta Kurt, and it contains guest appearances by Freddie Foxxx and Black Silver. Matthew peaked at #36 on the US Billboard Independent Albums and #47 on the Heatseekers Albums.

Track listing

Personnel
 Keith Thornton – main performer, producer (tracks: 1-15, 17), executive producer
 Kurt Matlin – producer (track 16), project coordinator
 James F. Campbell – guest performer (track 10)
 Christopher Rodgers – guest performer (track 14)

Charts

References

External links

2000 albums
Kool Keith albums